Demino is a rural locality in Polevskoy Selsoviet Rural Settlement, Kursky District, Kursk Oblast, Russia. Population:

Geography 
The village is located on the Seym River (a left tributary of the Desna), 103 km from the Russia–Ukraine border, 30 km south-east of the district center – the town Kursk, 7 km from the selsoviet center – Polevaya.

 Climate
Demino has a warm-summer humid continental climate (Dfb in the Köppen climate classification).

Transport 
Demino is located 10 km from the federal route  (Kursk – Voronezh –  "Kaspy" Highway; a part of the European route ), 2 km from the road of regional importance  (Kursk – Bolshoye Shumakovo – Polevaya via Lebyazhye), 7.5 km from the road  (R-298 – Polevaya), on the road of intermunicipal significance  (38K-014 – Demino), 2.5 km from the nearest railway halt Krasnikovo (railway line Klyukva — Belgorod).

The rural locality is situated 30 km from Kursk Vostochny Airport, 104 km from Belgorod International Airport and 182 km from Voronezh Peter the Great Airport.

References

Notes

Sources

Rural localities in Kursky District, Kursk Oblast